Barque Press is a London-based publisher of experimental poetry.  Founded in 1995 by Andrea Brady and Keston Sutherland. Barque's list includes Andrea Brady, Keston Sutherland, J. H. Prynne, John Tranter, John Wilkinson, Che Qianzi, and Peter Manson.

References 
British Poetry Magazines 1914-2000: A History and Bibliography of "Little Magazines", David Miller and Richard Price (British Library UK & Oak Knoll Press USA, 2006).

External links 
Official website

Small press publishing companies
Publishing companies established in 1995